is a bright, sub-kilometer asteroid, classified as near-Earth object and potentially hazardous asteroid (PHA) of the Aten group, located in Venus's zone of influence that has frequent close encounters with Mercury, Venus, and Earth. It made a close approach to Earth on 11 December 2015, passing at a distance of about 4.2 million kilometers (2.6 million miles, 11 lunar distances) and reaching about apparent magnitude 11.

The asteroid was discovered on 25 November 1998 by LINEAR about four months after a close encounter with the planet Mercury (about 0.047 AU). It measures approximately 400 meters in diameter. It is also one of the best studied PHAs and was the 10th Aten asteroid to be numbered.

Classification and orbit 

 orbits the Sun at a distance of 0.42–1.02 AU once every 7 months (222 days; semi-major axis of 0.72 AU). Its orbit has an eccentricity of 0.42 and an inclination of 7° with respect to the ecliptic.

Low aphelion 

At the time of its discovery, astronomers were trying to find the first Apohele asteroid (one that is always closer to the Sun than Earth). All asteroids known at the time that got closer to the Sun than Earth also crossed Earth's orbit. Earlier that year, David J. Tholen claimed to have spotted the first Apohele asteroid, which was dubbed . However, the object was lost without being confirmed. Thus, 1993 DA remained the asteroid with the lowest known aphelion at 1.023 AU. When  was discovered, it was found to have a slightly smaller aphelion (1.019 AU) than 1993 DA, and was thus the closest thing to an Apohele asteroid known at the time. It lost its smallest aphelion title almost immediately when  was discovered only a few weeks later (aphelion = 1.014 AU). Asteroids with even smaller aphelions were discovered until February 2003, when finally, an asteroid with an aphelion smaller than 1.000 AU was discovered. This was 163693 Atira, the first confirmed Apohele asteroid.

Venus zone of influence 

 was the second asteroid discovered to be close enough to Venus as to be within the major planet's zone of influence. It is located at about the inner edge of the zone, while (99907) 1989 VA, the first asteroid discovered there, is at about the outer edge. It is possible for planets to capture asteroids located in their sphere of influences into co-orbital relationships such as Trojan and horseshoe asteroids. Because of its frequent close encounters with Mercury and Earth, however, it may prove difficult for Venus to keep  in a co-orbital relationship for any length of time. Of the six objects in Venus's zone of influence, only one is currently a co-orbital.

Record close encounter 

 is a potentially hazardous asteroid. That means its orbit takes it very close to Earth and if it were to collide with our planet, it would cause devastation on at least a regional scale. On 16 December 2001, it became the first PHA to be observed passing within 5 Lunar Distances (the average distance between Earth and the Moon) from Earth. Other asteroids have come closer, and numerous have even come closer than the Moon, but these have all been small asteroids, incapable of causing much damage to the planet, or much concern. The 2001 encounter was the closest known approach to Earth any PHA had made since  passed by on 27 August 1969.

In September 2004, the well known PHA 4179 Toutatis came about 4 Lunar Distances from Earth. However, Toutatis arrived during a full moon, and thus 's 2001 encounter is still the most easily observed flyby of an asteroid in history. It also made  the first Near-Earth asteroid observed to be brighter than magnitude 10.

Frequent inner-planet encounters 

 is a Mercury-crosser asteroid, a Venus-crosser asteroid, and an Earth-crosser asteroid. Because of its relatively low inclination (7.34°), it is able to come close to each of these planets. Its orbit takes it within 0.021 AU of Mercury's orbit, 0.0368 AU of Venus's orbit, and 0.00989 AU of Earth's orbit. It makes frequent encounters with these inner planets. The last time it came close to Mercury, Venus and Earth was 2010, 1977, and 12 November 2004, respectively. The most recent close approach to Earth was on 11 December 2015 at about 4.2 million kilometers (2.6 million miles, 11 lunar distances). The next visit of the asteroid to Earth's neighborhood will be on 11 November 2018, when it will make a relatively distant pass at about 20 million kilometers (12.5 million miles, 52 lunar distances). These encounters perturb its orbit parameters slightly, and each pass reduces its inclination further.

Physical characteristics 

During its close encounters in 2001 and 2015, astronomers were able to make radar images of its surface and determine physical properties that remain unknown for most asteroids.

Diameter and albedo 

 measures between 350 and 415 meters in diameter and its surface has an albedo between 0.34 and 0.75. The Collaborative Asteroid Lightcurve Link an albedo of 0.34 and takes a diameter of 410 meters based on an absolute magnitude of 18.69. The asteroid is modestly elongated, approximately 420 × 330 meters.

Rotation period 

Several rotational lightcurves of  have been obtained from radiometric and photometric observations. Lightcurve analysis gave a consolidated rotation period of 3.697 hours with a brightness amplitude between 0.19 and 0.65 magnitude.

Future flyby candidate 

 has an orbit that not only crosses Earth's orbit, but is roughly parallel to it at its furthest. This means that during favourable years it is easy to reach from Earth. Several times this decade, it will be an easier target than Earth's own Moon. It is high on the list of possible Near-Earth Asteroid targets for future flybys, landings, mining, or orbit manipulations.

Numbering and naming 

This minor planet was numbered by the Minor Planet Center on 18 August 2002. As of 2018, it has not been named.

See also 
 List of asteroid close approaches to Earth in 2015

Notes

References

External links 
 IMAGES OF ASTEROID 1998 WT24 NASA
 Physical properties of near-Earth Asteroid (33342) 1998 WT24 shape model of 1998 WT24 from Goldstone and Arecibo radar imaging 2001
 Radar Investigations of Asteroid 33342 (1998 WT24) in December 2001 with Evpatoria-Medichina and Goldstone-Medichina Bistatic Systems
 
 
 

033342
033342
033342
033342
20151211
19981125